John Kelly "Dixie" Deans (born 30 July 1946) is a Scottish retired footballer. He played as a centre forward in the 1960s and 1970s, primarily for Motherwell and Celtic, and was a prolific goal-scorer. Deans played in two international matches for Scotland, both in 1974. He was nicknamed "Dixie" in honour of Everton and England centre-forward Dixie Dean.

Career
Deans joined Motherwell from Neilston Juniors in 1965 and spent six seasons with the Fir Park side. He signed for Celtic in a £17,500 deal on 31 October 1971 but was unable to play for Celtic immediately as he was, at the time, serving a six-match ban; during this period he spent his free time working in the Paisley office of the Evening Times.

He played for Celtic until 1976, and during this time he scored 125 goals in 186 games, and set several scoring records. The six goals he struck in a defeat of Partick Thistle in the 1973-74 season is a post-war record for a single game; Thistle's goalkeeper was the Scotland goalkeeper Alan Rough. He is the only player in Scottish football history to twice score a hat trick in a major cup final, achieving the feat in the 1972 Scottish Cup Final and the 1974 Scottish League Cup Final, both against Hibernian.

He is also remembered for the part he played in the semi-final of the 1971–72 European Cup, when Celtic were paired with Inter Milan, whom they had beaten in the final five years earlier. The two legs and extra-time failed to yield a single goal and so the tie proceeded to penalties. Deans, who had come on as a substitute, took the first kick for Celtic and missed. Inter then scored all five of their penalties and moved on to the final against Ajax. 

Deans earned two caps for Scotland, both in 1974. He was left out of the Scotland squad for the 1974 FIFA World Cup in West Germany. He had made the initial 40 man squad, but missed the final cut of 22, as Donald Ford and Denis Law were selected instead. Deans was eventually capped in October 1974, in a 3–0 win against East Germany, and a month later won a second cap in a 2–1 defeat against Spain.

In 1976, Deans was transferred to Luton Town in a £20,000 deal. He spent a month on loan to Carlisle United in 1977 and played briefly with League of Ireland side Shelbourne (5 league games, no goals) before moving to Australia to play for Adelaide City. He is still a hero to the Adelaide fans for his goal-scoring abilities when he was the leading scorer in Australia in 1977/78. With the club he also won the Australian Cup of 1979, defeating St. George in the final 3–2. He returned to Scotland with Partick Thistle in 1980, where he retired.

Retirement
In his autobiography There's Only One Dixie Deans, he claimed that whilst living in Australia, he met Bob Marley, who asked him, "Are you the Dixie Deans who used to play for Celtic?", and mentioned that he envied Deans for having played at Celtic Park. Deans is now a match-day host at Celtic Park, where he entertains guests along with other former Celtic players. He is also involved with business interests in Glasgow, owning "Dixie's" pub in Rutherglen, and was involved with former Celtic player Tommy Callaghan in the firm Esperanza Property Development.

Honours 
Motherwell
Scottish Division Two:  1968–69

Celtic
Scottish Division One: 1971–72, 1972–73, 1973–74
Scottish Cup: 1971–72, 1973–74
Scottish League Cup: 1974–75
Drybrough Cup: 1974–75

Adelaide City
NSL Cup: 1979

References

External links 

1946 births
Living people
Footballers from Renfrewshire
Association football forwards
Scottish footballers
Scottish Junior Football Association players
Scotland international footballers
Albion Rovers F.C. players
Motherwell F.C. players
Celtic F.C. players
Luton Town F.C. players
Carlisle United F.C. players
Partick Thistle F.C. players
Adelaide City FC players
Shelbourne F.C. players
Scottish Football League players
English Football League players
League of Ireland players
National Soccer League (Australia) players
Scottish expatriate footballers
Expatriate association footballers in the Republic of Ireland
Expatriate soccer players in Australia
Scottish league football top scorers
Scottish expatriate sportspeople in Australia
Scottish expatriate sportspeople in Ireland
Neilston Juniors F.C. players
Scotland junior international footballers